The Col de Jable (1,884 m) is a mountain pass in the western Swiss Alps, connecting L'Etivaz in the canton of Vaud to Gstaad in the canton of Bern. The pass is located between the Gummfluh and the Wittenberghorn. It is traversed by a trail.

See also
List of mountain passes in Switzerland

References

External links
Col de Jable on Hikr

Jable
Jable
Mountain passes of the canton of Vaud
Bern–Vaud border
Mountain passes of the canton of Bern